"Me and Bobby McGee" is a song written by American singer-songwriter Kris Kristofferson and originally performed by Roger Miller. Fred Foster shares the writing credit, as Kristofferson wrote the song based on a suggestion from Foster. A posthumously released version by Janis Joplin topped the U.S. singles chart in 1971, making the song the second posthumously released No. 1 single in U.S. chart history after "(Sittin' On) The Dock of the Bay" by Otis Redding. Gordon Lightfoot released a version that reached number 1 on the Canadian country charts in 1970. Jerry Lee Lewis released a version that was number 1 on the country charts in December 1971/January 1972 as the "B" side of "Would You Take Another Chance On Me." Billboard ranked Joplin's version as the No. 11 song for 1971.

History
The suggestion for the title was a cordial challenge from producer and Monument Records founder Fred Foster to Kris Kristofferson. The titular character was named for a studio secretary, Barbara "Bobbie" McKee, but Kristofferson had misheard her surname. He explained that he was trying to convey the despair of the last scene of Federico Fellini’s La Strada in which a broken, war-torn, inebriated man (played by Anthony Quinn) stares up from the beach at the night's stars, and breaks down sobbing.

Narrative
The song is the story of two drifters, the narrator and Bobby McGee. The pair hitch a ride from a truck driver and sing as they drive through the American South before making their way westward to California.  They visit California and then part ways, with the song's narrator expressing sadness afterwards. Due to the singer's name never being mentioned and the name "Bobby" being gender-neutral (especially in America), the song has been recorded by both male and female singers with only minor differences in the lyrical content.

Recordings and notable performances
Roger Miller was the first artist to record the song (in May 1969), and it appeared at No. 12 on the U.S. country chart in 1969. Kenny Rogers and The First Edition recorded the song in May/June 1969, and released it on their album Ruby, Don't Take Your Love To Town in 1969. On the Canadian charts, Gordon Lightfoot's version (recorded in November 1969) hit No. 13 on the pop music chart and No. 1 on the country music chart in 1970. The song was included on the 1970 Statler Brothers album Bed of Rose's, but was not released as a single.

Kris Kristofferson recorded his own version of the song on his debut album Kristofferson in 1970. Later that year, his version of the song appeared in Monte Hellman's psychedelic road movie Two-Lane Blacktop. Kristofferson also appears briefly singing the song in the 1971 Dennis Hopper film The Last Movie.

Janis Joplin recorded the song for inclusion on her Pearl album only a few days before her death in October 1970. Kris Kristofferson had sung the song for her, and singer Bob Neuwirth taught it to her. Kris Kristofferson did not know she had recorded the song until after her death. The first time he heard her recording of it was the day after she died. Janis Joplin's version topped the charts to become her only number one single and was ranked later No. 148 on Rolling Stones list of the 500 Greatest Songs of All Time.

Chart performance

Weekly singles charts

Roger Miller version

Gordon Lightfoot version

Janis Joplin version

Charley Pride version

Jerry Lee Lewis version

Year-end charts

Certifications

Janis Joplin's version

Selected list of recorded versions

1969 Roger Miller - album Roger Miller
1969 Roy Clark - album The Everlovin' Soul of Roy Clark
1969 The Stonemans - album Dawn of the Stonemans' Age
1969 Kenny Rogers & The First Edition - album Ruby, Don't Take Your Love to Town
1970 Charley Pride - album Just Plain Charley
1970 Ramblin' Jack Elliott - album Bull Durham Sacks & Railroad Tracks
1970 The Statler Brothers - album Bed of Rose's
1970 Gordon Lightfoot - album Sit Down Young Stranger
1970 Kris Kristofferson - album Kristofferson, this version also appears in the film Two-Lane Blacktop
1970 Bill Haley & His Comets - album Rock Around the Country
1970 Sam The Sham - single "Me And Bobby McGee/Key To The Highway" (Atlantic #2757)
1971 Dave Dudley - album Will the Real Dave Dudley Please Sing
1971 John Mogensen as "Carsten Levin" Danish - single, featured on the album John (1973)
1971 Janis Joplin U.S. number-one single, from the album Pearl 
1971 & 1972 Jerry Lee Lewis - B-side of "Would You Take Another Chance on Me" / album The Killer Rocks On
1971 Dottie West - album Have You Heard...
1971 Grateful Dead - album Skull & Roses
1971 Loretta Lynn - album I Wanna Be Free
1971 Lalla Hansson as "Anna & mej" Swedish - album Upp till Ragvaldsträsk scoring a Tio i Topp hit.
1972 Johnny Cash - album På Österåker
1972 Charlie McCoy - album Charlie McCoy
1972 Jeannie C. Riley  - album Give Myself a Party
1973 Waylon Jennings - album Lonesome, On'ry and Mean
1973 Chet Atkins - album Alone
1973 Thelma Houston - album Thelma Houston
1973 Olivia Newton-John - album Let Me Be There
1974 Lonnie Donegan - album Lonnie Donegan Meets Leinemann
1974 Cornelis Vreeswijk as "Jag och Bosse Lidén" Swedish - album Getinghonung
1979 Gianna Nannini as "Io e Bobby McGee" Italian - album California
1984 Joan Baez - album Live Europe '83 album
1990 The Highwaymen - Live: American Outlaws
1994 Melissa Etheridge - album Acoustic
1997 Loquillo - album Compañeros de viaje
1999 LeAnn Rimes - album LeAnn Rimes
1999 Barb Jungr - album Bare
2002 Anne Murray - album Country Croonin'
2002 Jennifer Love Hewitt - album Bare Naked
2002 Waterloo & Robinson as "Ich und BobbyMcGee" German - album Marianne
2003 Jerry Jeff Walker - album Too Old To Change
2004 Pink - album Live in Europe
2005 Dolly Parton - album Those Were The Days 
2005 Arlo Guthrie - album Live In Sydney
2006 Dale Ann Bradley - album Catch Tomorrow
2007 Angela Kalule - The Last King of Scotland soundtrack
2007 Caroline af Ugglas - album Joplin på Svenska
2008 Amanda Strydom - album kerse teen die donker
2010 Crystal Bowersox on American Idol iTunes release of studio version from Top 11 week, and Final 2 week, of season 9
2016 Matt Doyle - album Uncontrolled

References

External links
 New Yorker cartoon quoting the song
 A SecondHandSongs list of selected artists who covered "Me and Bobby McGee"
 FILM:ACOUSTIC - Kris Kristofferson performs "Me and Bobby McGee" and relates La Strada by The Modern School of Film at ArcLight Presents...
The Epic Story Behind Janis Joplin’s "Me and Bobby McGee" at History by Day
 

1969 songs
1969 singles
1970 singles
1971 singles
Billboard Hot 100 number-one singles
Taylor Horn songs
Joan Baez songs
Grateful Dead songs
Bill Haley songs
Janis Joplin songs
Kris Kristofferson songs
Gordon Lightfoot songs
Roger Miller songs
Jerry Lee Lewis songs
Number-one singles in Australia
Songs written by Kris Kristofferson
Grammy Hall of Fame Award recipients
Song recordings produced by Jerry Kennedy
Songs about trains
Songs about truck driving
Lalla Hansson songs
Songs released posthumously
BNA Records singles
Columbia Records singles
Smash Records singles